Lee Jones (born 9 August 1970 in Pontypridd, Rhondda Cynon Taff) is a former Welsh professional footballer who played as a goalkeeper.

Jones was signed in 2003 from Stockport County, and also played for Bristol Rovers, Swansea City and Blackpool. In 2004 he started the final as Blackpool won the 2003–04 Football League Trophy.

In December 2006, Jones joined Bury on an emergency seven-day loan. He made his debut against Mansfield Town on 9 December but wasn't available for Bury's FA Cup replay against Chester due to signing restrictions.

On 8 January 2007, Jones joined Darlington on loan from Blackpool for a month. On 31 January, the move from the club for whom he was voted Player of the Season in 2005–06 was made permanent.

In late 2007, Jones signed for Nantwich Town in the Northern Premier League Division One South. Jones was released in February 2010. He joined Morecambe as a coach, also sitting on the bench when the club became low on first team goalkeepers.

References

External links

1970 births
Living people
Association football goalkeepers
Welsh footballers
RCD Mallorca players
Stockport County F.C. players
Bristol Rovers F.C. players
Swansea City A.F.C. players
Crewe Alexandra F.C. players
Blackpool F.C. players
Bury F.C. players
Nantwich Town F.C. players
Darlington F.C. players
Morecambe F.C. players
English Football League players